Kenneth Daniel Harlan (July 26, 1895 – March 6, 1967)   was an American actor of the silent film era, playing mostly romantic leads or adventurer types.

Early life
Harlan was born in Boston, Massachusetts, the son of George W. Harlan and actress Rita W. Harlan (born Sarah Wolff). He was a graduate of Saint Francis High School in Brooklyn, New York City, and Fordham University in the Bronx.

Career
At age seven, Harlan began acting on stage and working in vaudeville. He spent much of 1916 touring with a company of dancers that headlined future  Ziegfeld performer Evan-Burrows Fontaine. His career spanned 25 years and included 200 features and serials, Harlan first entered the motion picture world in 1916 as the leading man under D.W. Griffith. Harlan later played with Constance Talmadge, Lois Weber, Mary Pickford, Katherine MacDonald, Anna May Wong,  and others. Harlan was skilled at drama and comedy, and made several westerns. Harlan had the leading role in two film serials, Finger Prints (1931) and Danger Island (1931).

He made a smooth transition to talkies, even singing in a few films, but his film roles remained minor throughout his later career. Harlan worked until the 1940s and retired in 1963.

Personal life and death
Harlan was married nine times, including a marriage to silent screen star Marie Prevost. His fifth wife was actress-singer Helene Stanton, whom he married in 1949 and divorced four years later.

Harlan, who was a nephew of actor and comedian Otis Harlan, died of an acute aneurysm in 1967 in Sacramento, California. He was 71.

Complete filmography

 Betsy's Burglar (1917) - Harry Brent
Cheerful Givers (1917) - Horace Gray
The Flame of the Yukon (1917) - George Fowler
The Price of a Good Time (1917) - Preston Winfield
 The Lash of Power (1917) - John Rand
My Unmarried Wife (1918) - Phillip Smith
A Man's Man (1918) - Billy Geary
The Wife He Bought (1918) - Steele Valiant
The Wine Girl (1918) - Frank Harris
 The Marriage Lie (1918) - Douglas Seward
The Model's Confession (1918) - Billy Ravensworth
Midnight Madness (1918) - Prentice Tiller
Her Body in Bond (1918) - Joe Blondin / Pierrot
Bread (1918) - Dick Frothingham
The Law That Divides (1918) - Howard Murray
The Microbe (1919) - DeWitt Spense
The Hoodlum (1919) - William Turner
The Trembling Hour (1919) - Major Ralph Dunstan
The Turning Point (1920) - Jack Rivett
 Dollars and Sense (1920) - David Rogers
The Penalty (1920) - Dr. Wilmot Allen
Going Some (1920) - Donald Keap
Love, Honor and Obey (1920) - Stuart Emmett
 Dangerous Business (1920) - Clarence Brooks
Mama's Affair (1921) - Dr. Harmon
Lessons in Love (1921) - John Warren
Nobody (1921) - Tom Smith
The Barricade (1921) - Robert Brennon
Woman's Place (1921) - Jim Bradley
Dawn of the East (1921) - Roger Strong
Received Payment (1922) - Cary Grant
Polly of the Follies (1922) - Bob Jones
The Primitive Lover (1922) - Donald Wales
I Am the Law (1922) - Cpl. Bob Fitzgerald
The Married Flapper (1922) - Bill Billings
 The World's a Stage (1922) - Wallace Foster
The Toll of the Sea (1922) - Allen Carver
Thorns and Orange Blossoms (1922) - Alan Randolph
The Beautiful and Damned (1922) - Anthony
Little Church Around the Corner (1923) - David Graham
The Girl Who Came Back (1923) - Martin Norries
 Temporary Marriage (1923) - Robert Belmar
East Side - West Side (1923) - Duncan Van Norman
The Virginian (1923) - The Virginian
April Showers (1923) - Danny O'Rourke
The Broken Wing (1923) - Philip Marvin
Poisoned Paradise: The Forbidden Story of Monte Carlo (1924) - Hugh Kildair / Gilbert Kildair
 The Virgin (1924) - David Kent
The Man Without a Heart (1924) - Rufus Asher
Butterfly (1924) - Craig Spaulding
White Man (1924) - White Man
 For Another Woman (1924)
 On the Stroke of Three (1924) - Judson Forrest
 Two Shall Be Born (1924) - Brian Kelly
Learning to Love (1925) - (uncredited)
The Re-Creation of Brian Kent (1925) - Brian Kent
The Crowded Hour (1925) - Billy Laidlaw
Drusilla with a Million (1925) - Colin Arnold
The Marriage Whirl (1925) - Arthur Carleton
 Ranger of the Big Pines (1925) - Ross Cavanagh
Bobbed Hair (1925) - David Lacy
 Soiled (1925) - Jimmie York
The Golden Strain (1925) - Milt Mulford Jr
The Fighting Edge (1926) - Juan de Dios O'Rourke
The King of the Turf (1926) - John Doe Smith
The Sap (1926) - Barry Weston
The Virgin Wife (1926) - Dr. Everett Webb
The Ice Flood (1926) - Jack De Quincey
Twinkletoes (1926) - Chuck Lightfoot
Easy Pickings (1927) - Peter Van Horne
 Stage Kisses (1927) - Donald Hampton
Cheating Cheaters (1927) - Tom Palmer
Streets of Shanghai (1927) - Sergeant Lee
 Wilful Youth (1927) - Jack Compton
Midnight Rose (1928) - Tim Regan
United States Smith (1928) - Cpl. Jim Sharkey
 Code of the Air (1928) - Blair Thompson
Man, Woman and Wife (1929) - Bill / Jack Mason
Paradise Island (1930) - Jim Thorne
Under Montana Skies (1930) - Clay Conning
Women Men Marry (1931) - Fred Moulton
Finger Prints (1931, Serial) - Gary Gordon
Air Police (1931) - Lt. Jerry Doyle
Danger Island (1931, Serial) - Captain Harry Drake
The Shadow of the Eagle (1932) - Ward
The Widow in Scarlet (1932) - Peter Lawton-Bond
Wanderer of the Wasteland (1935) - Bob
Cappy Ricks Returns (1935) - Matt Peasley
Man Hunt (1936) - Jim Davis
Song of the Saddle (1936) - Marshal Bill Graves
The Walking Dead (1936) - Stephen Martin
San Francisco (1936) - 'Chick'
Public Enemy's Wife (1936) - G-Man
China Clipper (1936) - Department of Commerce Inspector
The Case of the Velvet Claws (1936) - Peter Milnor
They Met in a Taxi (1936) - Mr. Andrews
Easy to Take (1936) - Judge Allen (uncredited)
The Accusing Finger (1936) - Police Surgeon (uncredited)
Hideaway Girl (1936) - Lead steward
Flying Hostess (1936) - 1st Detective
Trail Dust (1936) - Bowman
Penrod and Sam (1937) - Real G-Man
A Million to One (1937) - William Stevens
Marked Woman (1937) - Eddie, a Sugar Daddy
Gunsmoke Ranch (1937) - Phineas T. Flagg
The Go Getter (1937) - (scenes deleted)
San Quentin (1937) - Foreman (scenes deleted)
Kid Galahad (1937) - Reporter (uncredited)
Blazing Sixes (1937) - Major Taylor
Topper (1937) - Hotel Manager (uncredited)
Paradise Isle (1937) - Johnson
Wine, Women and Horses (1937) - Jed Bright
Renfrew of the Royal Mounted (1937) - Roger 'Angel' Carroll
Something to Sing About (1937) - Transportation Manager (uncredited)
The Shadow Strikes (1937) - Captain Breen
Submarine D-1 (1937) - Mr. Kelsey - Salvage Officer (uncredited)
The Mysterious Pilot (1937) - Carter Snowden
Wallaby Jim of the Islands (1937) - Michael Corell, Richter Henchman
Tim Tyler's Luck (1937, Serial) - Spencer, Trader [Chs. 2-3] (uncredited)
Saleslady (1938) - Bigelow
Swing It, Sailor! (1938) - First Officer
Blondes at Work (1938) - Marvin Spencer
Merrily We Live (1938) - Mr. Remington (uncredited)
Accidents Will Happen (1938) - Attorney Elmer Ross
Under Western Stars (1938) - Richards
Whirlwind Horseman (1938) - John Harper
Held for Ransom (1938) - McBride
Pride of the West (1938) - Caldwell - Banker
The Wages of Sin (1938) - Laundry Owner
Smashing the Rackets (1938) - Angry Businessman (uncredited)
Sunset Trail (1938) - John Marsh
Law of the Texan (1938) - Allen Spencer
The Headleys at Home (1938) - Smooth Adair
The Little Adventuress (1938) - Tom Eagan
The Duke of West Point (1938) - Varsity Football Coach
On Trial (1939) - Mr. John Trumbell - Juror #3
The Man Who Dared (1939) - Walton, a Henchman (uncredited)
The Flying Irishman (1939) - Man at New York Airport (uncredited)
Buck Rogers (1939, Serial) - Reporter at Wade's Lab (uncredited)
Torchy Runs for Mayor (1939) - Stan - Star Advertising Manager (uncredited)
The Oregon Trail (1939, Serial) - General Terry [Ch. 1] (uncredited)
Port of Hate (1939) - Bob Randall
Range War (1939) - Charley Higgins
Dick Tracy's G-Men (1939, Serial) - Clive Anderson
Heroes in Blue (1939) - Miller (uncredited)
The Night of Nights (1939) - Actor (uncredited)
The Green Hornet (1940, Serial) - Charles Roberts [Ch. 7] (uncredited)
Santa Fe Marshal (1940) - Blake - Henchman
Murder in the Air (1940) - Commander Wayne
Millionaires in Prison (1940) - Jerry Connell (uncredited)
Doomed to Die (1940) - Ludlow
Prairie Schooners (1940) - Dalton Stull
Junior G-Men (1940, Serial) - Dyer, Factory Gate Guard [Ch. 9] (uncredited)
A Little Bit of Heaven (1940) - Uncle Burt
Mysterious Doctor Satan (1940, Serial) - Capt. Lathrop [Chs. 1-2] (uncredited)
Pride of the Bowery (1940) - Police Captain Jim White
The Case of the Black Parrot (1940) - Ship's Captain (uncredited)
Secret Evidence (1941) - Frank Billings
Meet John Doe (1941) - Publicity Man (uncredited)
Sky Raiders (1941, Serial) - Blane [Ch. 2] (uncredited)
Million Dollar Baby (1941) - Reporter (uncredited)
Paper Bullets (1941) - Jim Adams
Desperate Cargo (1941) - Capt. Hank MacFarland
Bullets for O'Hara (1941) - Jim
Wide Open Town (1941) - Tom Wilson
King of Dodge City (1941) - Banker Carruthers
Dangerous Lady (1941) - Det. Dunlap
Fighting Bill Fargo (1941) - Sheriff Hackett
Dick Tracy vs. Crime Inc. (1941) - Police Lt. Cosgrove
Don Winslow of the Navy (1942, Serial) - Capt. Holding [Ch. 1] (uncredited)
Sleepytime Gal (1942) - Ticket Taker (uncredited)
Black Dragons (1942) - FBI Chief Colton
Klondike Fury (1942) - Flight Dispatcher
The Dawn Express (1942) - Agent Brown
The Corpse Vanishes (1942) - Editor Keenan
Perils of the Royal Mounted (1942, Serial) - John Craig - Phony Commissioner [Chs.10-11]
Juke Girl (1942) - Atlanta Produce Dealer (uncredited)
Wings for the Eagle (1942) - Supervisor (uncredited)
Bandit Ranger (1942) - Mark Kenyon
Deep in the Heart of Texas (1942) - Captain Sneed
Phantom Killer (1942) - Police Lt. Jim Brady
Foreign Agent (1942) - George McCall
You Can't Escape Forever (1942) - Fingerprint Division Lieutenant (uncredited)
Hitler – Dead or Alive (1942) - Cutler
The Sundown Kid (1942) - Warden Penrose (uncredited)
Silent Witness (1943) - Detective Tommy Jackson
G-Men vs. the Black Dragon (1943, Serial) - Lab Guard / Officer Casey (uncredited)
You Can't Beat the Law (1943) - First Warden
Wild Horse Stampede (1943) - Borman
A Stranger in Town (1943) - Banker in Barbershop (uncredited)
Daredevils of the West (1943, Serial) - Territorial Commissioner [Ch. 9, 10]
Girls in Chains (1943) - Police Lt. Jackson (uncredited)
The Masked Marvel (1943, Serial) - Plant Guard [Ch. 1] / Police Car 7 Driver [Ch. 3]
The Law Rides Again (1943) - John Hampton
Melody Parade (1943) - Jedson
Adventures of the Flying Cadets (1943, Serial) - Baggage Car Clerk [Ch. 2] (uncredited)
 The Underdog (1943) - Eddie Mohr
Nearly Eighteen (1943) - Sammy Klein (final film role)

Short films
Foiled Again (1932, Short) - The Hero
Movie Maniacs (1936, Short) - Leading Man

References

External links
 
 
 
 Kenneth Harlan at Virtual History
 Kenneth Harlan portrait gallery NY Public Library Billy Rose Collection
 

1895 births
1967 deaths
American male silent film actors
American male film actors
Male film serial actors
Burials at Hollywood Forever Cemetery
Fordham University alumni
20th-century American male actors